David Cameron (born 15 September 1969) is a Canadian professional darts player, who mainly competes in the World Darts Federation tournaments. He is the first and сurrent 2022 World Seniors Darts Masters champion and triple Canadian champion.

Career
Cameron has appeared at the BDO World Darts Championship six times, but hasn't got past the first round in his first five appearances, his only win coming against Jimmy Hendriks in 2017. In 2019 he reached the second round for the first time.

He has also entered both editions of the PDC US Darts Masters in Las Vegas, qualifying both times. However, he hasn't won a stage match in the four events that this achievement entails. In 2017, he lost 6–5 to Dawson Murschell in the North American Championship before losing 6–3 to Raymond van Barneveld in the 2017 US Darts Masters. Cameron only managed one leg in the two tournaments in 2018, going out to John Norman Jnr and Michael Smith in the respective events.

Cameron took part in the 2022 WDF World Darts Championship where he was defeated in the 1st round by Ian Jones 2-1. Because of his early exit he was able to take part in the qualifiers for the 2022 World Seniors Darts Masters taking an Uber to Reading from Lakeside on the Saturday where he qualified for the TV Event beating Paul Hogan 6-0 in the final game 

Cameron took part in the 2022 World Seniors Darts Masters after winning a qualifier. He beat Kevin Painter 4–3, Robert Thornton 4–2, Colin Monk 4–2, Richie Howson 5–2 and won the final 6–3 against 16-time World Champion Phil Taylor to become the inaugural winner of the event.

World Championship results

BDO/WDF
 2014: Preliminary round (lost to Martin Adams 1–3)
 2015: Preliminary round (lost to Michel van der Horst 2–3)
 2016: Preliminary round (lost to Ted Hankey 0–3)
 2017: First round (lost to Danny Noppert 1–3)
 2018: Preliminary round (lost to Michael Unterbuchner 2–3)
 2019: Second round (lost to Kyle McKinstry 3–4)
 2020: Preliminary round (lost to Nick Fullwell 1–3)
 2022: First round (lost to Ian Jones 1–2)

PDC
 2023: Second round (Lost to Danny Noppert 1–3)

WSDT
 2023: First round (Lost to Richie Howson 2–3)

Career finals

Seniors major finals: 1 (1 title)

External links
David Cameron's profile and stats on Darts Database

References

Living people
Canadian darts players
British Darts Organisation players
1969 births
People from New Glasgow, Nova Scotia
Sportspeople from Nova Scotia
21st-century Canadian people